Adama Traoré Diarra (born 25 January 1996), simply known as Adama, is a Spanish professional footballer who plays as a winger for Premier League club Wolverhampton Wanderers and the Spain national team. With his speed and strength he is one of the fastest players in the world.

Traoré began his career with Barcelona, appearing mainly for the reserves. In 2015, he signed for Aston Villa and a year later Middlesbrough, before joining Wolverhampton Wanderers in August 2018. He was loaned back to Barcelona in 2022.

Traoré has represented Spain internationally at both youth and senior levels, making his senior debut in 2020.

Club career

Barcelona

Traoré was born in L'Hospitalet de Llobregat, Barcelona, Catalonia, to Malian parents. He joined Barcelona's youth setup in 2004 at the age of eight, after a brief period with neighbouring L'Hospitalet. In 2013 he was promoted to the B-team, and made his debut on 6 October in a 0–1 away defeat against Ponferradina in the Segunda División championship.

On 9 November 2013, Traoré came on as a half-time substitute but was sent off for conceding a penalty in a 0–3 loss to Real Jaén at the Mini Estadi. Two weeks later, he played his first La Liga game at the age of only 17, replacing Neymar late on in the 4–0 home win over Granada; he made his first appearance in the UEFA Champions League on 26 November, coming on for Cesc Fàbregas in the 82nd minute of a 1–2 defeat away to Ajax in the group stage.

Traoré also featured for Barcelona's under-19 side in the inaugural edition of the UEFA Youth League, playing five times and netting twice as they won the trophy. He scored his first official goal for the Blaugrana'''s main squad on 16 December 2014, playing 16 minutes and contributing with a goal in an 8–1 home victory over SD Huesca in the 2014–15 Copa del Rey.

Aston Villa
On 14 August 2015, Traoré joined Premier League club Aston Villa on a five-year deal for a reported £7 million (€10 million) that could rise to €12 million, with Barcelona inserting a three-year buy-back clause in his contract. He made his debut eight days later against Crystal Palace, and his cross led to an own goal from Pape Souaré eight minutes after he had entered the game as a substitute for Carlos Sánchez. He scored his first goal three days later, the team's first of a 5–3 home win over Notts County in the second round in the League Cup.

Traoré came on as a second-half substitute for the last-placed Villans away to relegation rivals Sunderland on 2 January 2016, and via a counter-attack he assisted compatriot Carles Gil's aerial volley equaliser – he was later replaced himself through injury, and his team lost 3–1. Following that game, he was dropped from the team due to indiscipline, as the season ended with relegation.

Middlesbrough
On 31 August 2016, Traoré signed a four-year contract with Middlesbrough and Albert Adomah moved in the opposite direction; the fees were undisclosed. He made his debut on 10 September 2016 in a 1–2 home loss to Crystal Palace, replacing Cristhian Stuani for the final nine minutes; during his first season, he took part in 31 matches without scoring.

Traoré played during 2017–18, first under Garry Monk and then Tony Pulis, with his pace sometimes causing several problems for opposition defenders, including an impressive performance against Leeds United on 2 March 2018 in a 3–0 win. He totalled five goals and ten assists during the campaign as his team reached the play-offs in the Championship, where they were knocked out by his former side Aston Villa; consequently, he won Middlesbrough's Fans' Player of the Year, Young Player of the Year and Players' Player of the Year awards.

Wolverhampton Wanderers
On 8 August 2018, Traoré joined newly promoted Wolverhampton Wanderers on a five-year deal for an undisclosed fee in the region of £18 million. He scored his first goal for the team and in the Premier League on 1 September – in his 40th appearance in the competition – in a 1–0 win away to West Ham United. His first start occurred on 27 October, in a 0–1 away defeat to Brighton & Hove Albion.

On 6 October 2019, in his 50th competitive appearance for Wolves, Traoré scored both goals in a 2–0 away victory against reigning champions Manchester City. He scored his first goal in UEFA European club football as Wolves drew 3–3 away to Braga in the UEFA Europa League group stage on 28 November.

Traoré scored his debut Molineux goal for his club in a 1–2 defeat to Tottenham Hotspur in the Premier League on 15 December 2019. He won the PFA Player of the Month award for January 2020 with 45 percent of fan votes.

Traoré's first goal for Wolves in the 2020–21 season came in their 1–0 home victory over Crystal Palace in a FA Cup third-round game on 8 January 2021.

Traoré marked his 100th Premier League appearance for Wolves with his tenth goal for the club in a 2–1 victory over Brighton & Hove Albion at Molineux on 9 May 2021.

Traoré scored his debut goal of the 2021–22 season on 15 January 2022, in a 3–1 Premier League victory over Southampton at Molineux.

Traoré's first start for Wolves in the 2022–23 season after his loan at Barcelona in the second-half of the 2021–22 season came in a 2–1 victory over Preston North End at Molineux in the EFL Cup on 23 August 2022, in which Traoré scored Wolves's second.

Traoré scored his 10th Premier League goal (and 14th goal for Wolves in total) on 4 March 2023, ensuring Wolves a 1–0 home win against Tottenham Hotspur.

 Loan to Barcelona 
On 29 January 2022, Barcelona announced that they had reached an agreement with Wolverhampton Wanderers to bring Traoré back on a loan, with a contract until 30 June 2022 and an option to make the deal permanent.

A possibly unique situation occurred in a match in February 2022 during Barcelona's tour to Australia, when they faced an Australian invitational XI. Adama Traoré scored for Barcelona, and his namesake Adama Traoré scored for the Australian side.

On 1 July 2022, Traoré returned to Wolverhampton Wanderers after the club opted not to sign him permanently.

International career
On 17 February 2014, the Malian Football Federation reported that Traoré and his older brother Moha had decided to represent Mali at senior level. However, in an interview with BBC Sport in October 2015, the former stated that he was still considering his international options. He made his debut for the Spanish under-21s on 22 March 2018, playing 15 minutes in the 5–3 away win over Northern Ireland in the 2019 UEFA European Championship qualifiers.

In November 2019, Traoré declared that he wanted to play for Mali. However, days later he received his first call-up in the Spain national team for Euro 2020 qualifying matches against Malta and Romania in place of injured Rodrigo. He pulled out of the squad voluntarily due to injury, and was replaced by Pablo Sarabia.

In January 2020, he said he had not decided between Spain and Mali after a photograph of him posing with a Mali shirt circulated online, saying "I am grateful (to have the chance) with the two international teams - Spain where I was born and Mali where my origins are."

In August 2020, Traoré was again called up ahead of Spain's September UEFA Nations League matches against Germany and Ukraine. However, he was removed from the squad after testing positive for COVID-19 on 31 August. He missed the Germany match as he awaited the result of the second test to determine if the initial result was a false positive. The second test result was negative and Traoré rejoined the squad on 3 September, ahead of the Ukraine match. On 6 September, Traoré was once again ordered to leave the camp after a PCR test showed a high antibody count.

On 7 October 2020, Traoré made his first appearance for Spain in a friendly match against Portugal, coming on as a substitute in the 62nd minute. The match ended in a scoreless draw. On 10 October, Traoré again came on as a substitute for Spain in a Nations League match against Switzerland. Both Mali and Spain had named Traoré to their respective squads for their matches during the October international fixture window, but with his appearance in a competitive match against Switzerland, he is cap-tied to Spain and FIFA eligibility rules prevents him from representing Mali.

On 24 May 2021, he was included in Luis Enrique's 24-man squad for UEFA Euro 2020.

Style of play
Tim Sherwood, Traoré's manager at Villa, compared him to both Lionel Messi and Cristiano Ronaldo, saying he had "a bit" of both. Catherine Wilson of ESPN FC credited his "athleticism", though also remarked that his "footballing brain and teamwork skills are definitely up for debate".

In 2018, ESPN's Matt Stanger acknowledged Traoré's pace and strength, and added that he "is now showing the composure to find the killer pass", while boasting "rapid acceleration" and "excellent close control to shield the ball from defenders"; Stanger also believed Traoré's "defensive contribution" to be developed, pointing his key weaknesses as "moments of recklessness" and "decision-making" which "continues to frustrate his teammates"; he was also described by Teesside Gazettes Philip Tallentire as a 'talismanic playmaker', after his form during the 2017–18 season. The Daily Mirror listed Traoré second in the top 10 fastest players of the 2019–20 Premier League Season, with a top speed of 23.48 mph.

While with Wolverhampton Wanderers, after his first three appearances as a substitute, Michael Butler of The Guardian reported: "Traoré has always been regarded as a rough diamond, lightning quick but perhaps lacking composure or an end product. [...] Per 90 minutes, nobody in the Premier League has created more chances than the 22-year-old or completed even half the number of successful dribbles: Eden Hazard has 5.56 to Traoré's 11.87.

Personal life
Traoré's elder brother, Moha, is also a footballer.

Career statistics
Club

International

HonoursBarcelona YouthUEFA Youth League: 2013–14BarcelonaCopa del Rey: 2014–15Individual'''
Segunda División Team of the Year: 2013–14
Middlesbrough Fans' Player of the Year: 2017–18
Middlesbrough Players' Player of the Year: 2017–18
Middlesbrough Young Player of the Year: 2017–18
PFA Player of the Month: January 2020

References

External links

Profile at the Wolverhampton Wanderers F.C. website

1996 births
Living people
Footballers from L'Hospitalet de Llobregat
Spanish footballers
Spain youth international footballers
Spain under-21 international footballers
Spain international footballers
Association football wingers
FC Barcelona Atlètic players
FC Barcelona players
Aston Villa F.C. players
Middlesbrough F.C. players
Wolverhampton Wanderers F.C. players
Segunda División players
La Liga players
Premier League players
English Football League players
UEFA Euro 2020 players
Spanish expatriate footballers
Expatriate footballers in England
Spanish expatriate sportspeople in England
Spanish people of Malian descent
Spanish sportspeople of African descent